Abdul-Qader Arnaout, (1928–26 November 2004), born Kadri Sokoli was an Albanian Islamic scholar who specialised in the fields of hadith and fiqh.

Biography
Arnaoot received his initial religious training with Hanafi scholars, before breaking with them to continue his quest for knowledge through self-teaching.

The Ba'ath government banned Arnaout from giving lectures and teaching. Arnaout died on 26 November 2004 in Damascus under quasi-house arrest and without leaving a successor. His funeral prayer was held after the Jumu'ah prayer at the Zayn ul-'Abidin mosque in Al-Maydan, Damascus, and was attended by tens of thousands of people. He was 78 years old.

References

Hadith scholars
Islam in Syria
1928 births
2004 deaths
Albanian Sunni Muslim scholars of Islam
Syrian people of Albanian descent
Biographical evaluation scholars